The Irish League in season 1893–1894 comprised 6 teams, and Glentoran F.C. won the championship.

League standings

Results

References
Northern Ireland - List of final tables (RSSSF)

External links
 Irish Premier League Website
 Irish Football Club Project 

1893-94
1893–94 domestic association football leagues
Lea